Scott Young may refer to:

Sportspeople
 Scott Young (American football) (born 1981), American football guard for the Denver Broncos of the National Football League
 Scott Young (ice hockey, born 1965), retired Canadian professional ice hockey defenceman
 Scott Young (ice hockey, born 1967), retired American professional ice hockey right winger
 Scott Young (English footballer) (born 1969), English footballer
 Scott Young (Welsh footballer) (born 1976), Welsh football player
 Scott Young (Scottish footballer) (born 1977), Scottish footballer and manager

Others
 Scott Young (politician) (born 1961), mayor of Port Coquitlam, British Columbia
 Scott Young (writer) (1918–2005), Canadian writer and sports journalist
 Scot Young (1962–2014), British businessman